Lætitia Agab-Cluzel (born 13 February 1985) is a footballer who plays as a defender. She previously played for Saint-Étienne in Division 1 Feminine, and Le Puy Foot 43 Auvergne in France's second division league. Born in France, she represented the Algeria at international level.

Early life
Agab-Cluzel began playing football with boys at a young age. She followed her father who played for Talaudiere.

Playing career

Club
Agab made her debut for Saint-Étienne during the 2006–07 season. She made seven starts in her eight appearances for the club in the second division. After the team moved to Division 1 Feminine starting in the 2007–08 season, Agab made 11 starts in her 15 appearances. The team finished in fourth place during the regular season with a  record. During the 2008–09 season, she made 11 starts in 15 appearances. The team finished in eight place with a  record. Returning to Saint-Étienne for her fourth consecutive season, Agab made 16 appearances during the 2009–10 season, making 10 starts. The team finished in sixth place with  record. During the 2010–11 season, the team finished in fifth place. Agab made five appearances.

International
A dual citizen of France and Algeria, Agab represented Algeria on the Algeria women's national football team starting in 2007. She competed with the team at the African Games tournament and the Africa Women Cup of Nations qualifications.

Honors and awards
Saint-Étienne
 Coupe de France Féminine Winner: 2010−11

References

External links
 

1985 births
Living people
Algerian women's footballers
Women's association football defenders
Algeria women's international footballers
Footballers from Saint-Étienne
French women's footballers
AS Saint-Étienne (women) players
French sportspeople of Algerian descent